The 1991 Benson and Hedges Open was a men's professional tennis tournament held in Auckland, New Zealand. The even was part of the World Series category of the 1991 ATP Tour. It was the 24th edition of the tournament and was played on outdoor hard courts from 7 January to 14 January 1991. Fourth-seeded Karel Nováček won the singles title.

Finals

Singles

 Karel Nováček defeated  Jean-Philippe Fleurian 7–6(7–5), 7–6(7–4)
 It was Nováček's 1st title of the year and the 4th of his career.

Doubles

 Sergio Casal /  Emilio Sánchez defeated  Grant Connell /  Glenn Michibata 4–6, 6–3, 6–4
 It was Casal's 1st title of the year and the 33rd of his career. It was Sánchez's 1st title of the year and the 45th of his career.

References

External links
 
 ATP – tournament profile
 ITF – tournament edition details

Heineken Open
Heineken
ATP Auckland Open
January 1991 sports events in New Zealand